Penikufesin is the third EP by the American thrash metal band Anthrax. Culled from the State of Euphoria sessions, it was released in August 1989 on Megaforce Records/Island Records.

Background
The EP includes the songs "Now It's Dark" (from State of Euphoria), a French version of the Trust cover "Antisocial" (the English version also appeared on State of Euphoria), the classic tune "Friggin' in the Riggin'" (made famous by the Sex Pistols), "Parasite" (a Kiss cover), "Le Sects" (another Trust cover) and "Pipeline" (a surf rock instrumental recorded by the Chantays). The last three songs later appeared on Attack of the Killer B's ("Le Sects" was renamed "Sects"). "Friggin' in the Riggin'" was previously released as the B-side of the 1988 single "Make Me Laugh", while the French version of "Antisocial" had appeared on the Australian edition of State of Euphoria; this track was later released on the compilation album Anthrology: No Hit Wonders (1985–1991).

Penikufesin means "nise [nice] fukin [fucking]" EP" spelled backwards. It refers to a song entitled "Efilnikufesin (N.F.L.)" ("ni[c]e fu[c]kin' life") that appeared on Anthrax's 1987 album Among the Living, another song called "N.F.B. (Dallabnikufesin)" ("ni[c]e fu[c]kin' ballad"), which later appeared on the band's 1991 compilation album Attack of the Killer B's, also refers to that song.

Releases
The album was released in August 1989 by Megaforce Records / Island Records in Europe, Japan and Australia.

Penikufesin has never been officially released in the U.S. or Canada, although Anthrax themselves have since acknowledged it as a canon release, and for a while, the EP had been listed on the discography page from their official website. The EP's tracks would resurface on the State of Euphoria reissue that is part of the Aftershock four-CD set of albums.

Track listing

Personnel
Anthrax
Joey Belladonna – Lead vocals
Dan Spitz – Lead guitar
Scott Ian – Rhythm guitar, Backing vocals
Frank Bello – Bass, Backing vocals
Charlie Benante – Drums

Production
Anthrax – Producer
Mark Dodson – Producer
Jon Zazula – Executive producer
Marsha Zazula – Executive producer
Alex Perialas – Associate producer, Engineer
Neil Zlozower – Front cover photo
Gene Ambo – Back cover photos

Charts

References

1989 EPs
Anthrax (American band) EPs
Thrash metal EPs